In 2016 in Norway, the reigning monarch is King Harald V of Norway. The Prime Minister of Norway is Erna Solberg , who has been Prime Minister since October 2013. The president of the Storting is Olemic Thommessen, who has also been in power since October 2013. Norway will be hosting the 2016 Winter Youth Olympics in Lillehammer in 2016. Lillehammer was previously the host of the 1994 Winter Olympics. Norway will be hosting local or international music festivals for various genres of music including metal, opera, jazz and Church music.

Incumbents

 Monarch – Harald V
 Prime Minister – Erna Solberg (Conservative).

Events
26 April – The CHC Helikopter Service Flight 241, carrying oil workers from the Gullfaks B platform in the North Sea, crashes near Turøy, and all thirteen crew and passengers die.

Cultural events

January
21–24 January – Ice Music Festival in Geilo
27–30 January – Bodø Jazz Open in Bodø
29 January-7 February – Nordlysfestivalen in Tromsø

February
7 February – Oslo Operaball in Oslo
12–21 February – 2016 Winter Youth Olympics in Lillehammer

March
2–5 March – By:Larm 2016 in Oslo
5 March – 150th anniversary of the Storting building
4–13 March – Oslo International Church Music Festival 2016 in Oslo
23–26 March – Inferno Metal Festival 2016 in Oslo

May
28 May – 200th anniversary of the Norwegian Bible Society

Notable deaths

5 January – Hanna-Marie Weydahl, pianist (b. 1922)
9 January – Elnar Seljevold, correspondent (b. 1934)
10 January – Bård Breivik, sculptor (b. 1948)
11 January – Berge Furre, politician (b. 1937)
12 January – Thor Furulund, painter (b. 1943)
18 January – Lars Roar Langslet, politician (b. 1936)
18 January – Leif Dubard, radio personality (b. 1931)
18 January – Karsten Isachsen, priest and speaker (b. 1944)
18 January – Nicolaus Zwetnow, sport shooter and physician (b. 1929)
20 January – Helga Salvesen, physician (b. 1963)
24 January – Fredrik Barth, social anthropologist (b. 1928)
25 January – Leif Solberg, composer (b. 1914)
30 January – Tias Eckhoff, designer (b. 1926)
1 February – Paul Cappelen, architect (b. 1928)
2 February – Dag Gundersen, lexicographer (b. 1928)
3 February – Arnold Weiberg-Aurdal, politician (b. 1925)
5 February – Carl E. Wang, politician (b. 1930)
8 February – Erlend Østgaard, physicist (b. 1938)
10 February – Jakob Aano, politician (b. 1920)
12 February – Martin Jensen, athlete (b. 1942)
12 February – Sossen Krohg, actress (b. 1923)
12 February – Bergljot Hobæk Haff, novelist (b. 1925)
17 February – Arthur J. Aasland, businessperson (b. 1934)
19 February – Harald Devold, jazz saxophonist (b. 1964)
19 February – Jon Anders Helseth, radio and TV presenter (b. 1933)
22 February – Christian Berg-Nielsen, diplomat (b. 1929)
26 February – Ivan Kristoffersen, editor (b. 1931)
28 February – Hallstein Rasmussen, civil servant (b. 1925)
1 March – Magnhild Bråthen, concentration camp survivor (b. 1924)
4 March – Thea Knutzen, politician (b. 1930)
5 March – Even Hansen, footballer (b. 1923)
7 March – Magnus Ulleland, philologist (b. 1929)
11 March – Kari Diesen, Jr., entertainer (b. 1939)
20 March – Sveinung Valle, politician (b. 1959)
24 March – Johannes Elviken, speed skater (b. 1912)
30 March – Anne Aasheim, editor (b. 1962)
4 April – Jarle Bondevik, philologist (b. 1934)
5 April – Kari Børresen, theologian (b. 1932)
4 April – Andris Snortheim, children's musician (b. 1950)
9 April – Finn Hodt, speed skater (b. 1919)
24 April – Jan Henrik Kayser, pianist (b. 1933)
28 April – Fredrik Grønningsæter, bishop (b. 1923)
5 May – Martha Seim Valeur, politician (b. 1923)
16 May – Bjarne Saltnes, politician (b. 1934)
18 May – Astrid Gunnestad, editor and radio presenter (b. 1938)
18 May – Skjalg Jensen, politician (b. 1967)
23 May – Arne Sandnes, politician (b. 1924)
23 May – Vera Henriksen, author (b. 1927)
25 May – Per Øien, musician (b. 1937)
27 May – Kai G. Henriksen, businessman (b. 1956)
30 May – Jan Aas, footballer (b. 1944)
31 May – Olav Djupvik, politician (b. 1931)
3 June – Arve Solstad, editor (b. 1935)
4 June – Geirmund Ihle, politician (b. 1934)
8 June – Terje Fjærn, band leader (b. 1942)
10 June – Alfred Oftedal Telhaug, educationalist (b. 1934)
10 June – Per Bakken, industrialist (b. 1937)
11 June – Lars Skytøen, politician (b. 1929)
12 June – Gunnar Gran, editor (b. 1931)
12 June – Dagfinn Gedde-Dahl, physician (b. 1937)
14 June – Per Hovdenakk, museum director (b. 1935)
15 June – Erik Enger, physician (b. 1927)
17 June – Willy Andresen, musician (b. 1921)
17 June – Reidar Kvaal, resistance member (b. 1916)
18 June – Sverre Kjelsberg, musician (b. 1946)
27 June – Anfin Skaaheim, missionary leader (b. 1939)
27 June – Stein Madsen, footballer (b. 1954)
28 June – Ragnar Pedersen, ethnologist (b. 1941)
29 June – Gunnar Garbo, politician (b. 1924)
29 June – Frode Nilsen, diplomat (b. 1923)
4 July – Kjell Olaf Jensen, literary critic (b. 1946)
14 July – Tor Lian, handball official  (b. 1945)
22 July – Geir Myhre, ice hockey player (b. 1954)
23 July – Carl Falck, wholesaler (b. 1907)
24 July – Håkon Fimland, hurdler (b. 1942)
28 July – Marianne Ihlen, person (b. 1935)
31 July – Jon Klette, jazz saxophonist (b. 1962)
31 July – Kjell Underlid, psychologist (b. 1950)
4 August – Eivald Røren, scientist (b. 1932)
5 August – Erling Ree-Pedersen, tax director (b. 1922)
6 August – Jan Wilsgaard, Volvo designer (b. 1930)
9 August – Per Müller, singer (b. 1932)
10 August – Helen Brinchmann, actress (b. 1918)
11 August – Sigbjørn Ravnåsen, politician (b. 1941)
13 August – Holger Ursin, professor of medicine (b. 1934)
15 August – Knut Kjøk, fiddler (b. 1948)
16 August – Knut Aunbu, television producer (b. 1943)
18 August – Fred Nøddelund, musician (b. 1947)
22 August – Per Lønning, bishop and politician (b. 1928)
23 August – Berit Mørdre, skier (b. 1940)
26 August – Harald Grønningen, skier (b. 1934)
30 August – Peter Wollnick, radio presenter (b. 1927)
1 September – Leif Mæhle, philologist (b. 1927)
2 September – Thorstein Sandholt, speed skater (b. 1935)
3 September – Jan Otto Hauge, editor (b. 1945)
3 September – Jan Nilsen, footballer (b. 1937)
10 September – Knut Wiggen, composer (b. 1927)
10 September – Sonja Barth, environmentalist (b. 1923)
11 September – Per Brandtzæg, professor of medicine (b. 1936)
12 September – Tor Brustad, biophysicist (b. 1926)
15 September – Haakon Sørbye, resistance member (b. 1920)
21 September – Ragnar Hvidsten, footballer (b. 1926)
22 September – Svein Gunnar Morgenlien, politician (b. 1922)
24 September – Wenche Lowzow, politician (b. 1926)
26 September – Wilhelm Mohr, aviation officer (b. 1917)
26 September – Jens Lothe, physicist (b. 1931)
28 September – Gunnar Block Watne, industrialist (b. 1929)
30 September – Lilleba Lund Kvandal, opera singer (b. 1940)
2 October – Georg Apenes, politician (b. 1940)
8 October – Jan "Jonas" Gulbrandsen, footballer (b. 1933)
10 October – Hans Petter Langtangen, computer scientist  (b. 1962)
10 October – Christian Erlandsen, physician and politician (b. 1926)
10 October – Benn Mikalsen, politician (b. 1956)
15 October – Per Rune Wølner, footballer (b. 1949)
21 October – Kjell Aas, physician (b. 1924)
24 October – Johan Stølan, politician (b. 1939)
25 October – Bjørn Lidin Hansen, footballer (b. 1989)
30 October – Leif Einar Plahter, art historian (b. 1929)
1 November – Sverre Andersen, footballer (b. 1936)
3 November – Turid Karlsen Seim, theologian (b. 1945)
7 November – Birger Jansen, ice hockey player (b. 1948)
11 November – Lauritz Bernhard Sirevaag, politician (b. 1926)
13 November – Aslaug Fadum, politician (b. 1925)
22 November – Per Sundby, physician (b. 1926)
25 November – Marit Kalstad, children's writer (b. 1931)
26 November – Alv Gjestvang, speed skater (b. 1937)
26 November – Ida Blom, historian (b. 1931)
27 November – Eystein Paasche, botanist (b. 1932)

2 December – Tove Kari Viken, politician (b. 1942)
6 December – Jan Frøystein Halvorsen, Supreme Court Justice (b. 1928)
11 December – Oddvar S. Kvam, composer (b. 1927)
14 December – Arnie Norse, entertainer (b. 1925)
18 December – Rolf Trygve Busch, diplomat (b. 1920)
18 December – Vibeke Knudsen, diplomat (b. 1948)
19 December – Anne Borg, dancer (b. 1936)
26 December – Joachim Calmeyer, actor (b. 1931)

See also
 2016 in Norwegian music
 2016 in Norwegian television

References

 
2010s in Norway
Years of the 21st century in Norway
Norway